Martin Grönberg (born May 11, 1994) is a Swedish professional ice hockey player. He is currently playing with the Sparta Warriors of the Norwegian GET-ligaen.

Gronberg made his Swedish Hockey League debut playing with Leksands IF during the 2013–14 SHL season.

References

External links

1994 births
Living people
Leksands IF players
Swedish ice hockey centres
Sparta Warriors players
People from Falun
Sportspeople from Dalarna County